In Judaism, shechita (also transliterated shehitah, shechitah, shehita) is ritual slaughtering of certain mammals and birds for food according to kashrut.

Sources
 states that sheep and cattle should be slaughtered "as I have instructed you", but nowhere in the Torah are any of the practices of shechita described. Instead, they have been handed down in Rabbinic Judaism's Oral Torah, and codified in halakha.

Species

The animal must be of a permitted species. For mammals, this is restricted to ruminants which have split hooves. For birds, although biblically any species of bird not specifically excluded in  would be permitted, doubts as to the identity and scope of the species on the biblical list led to
rabbinical law permitting only birds with a tradition of being permissible.

Shochet 
A shochet ("slaughterer", plural shochtim) is a person who performs shechita. To become a shochet, one must study which slaughtered animals are kosher, what disqualifies them from being kosher, and how to prepare animals according to the laws of shechita. Subjects of study include the preparation of slaughtering tools, ways to interpret which foods follow the laws of shechita, and types of terefot (deformities which make an animal non-kosher).

In the Talmudic era (beginning in 200 CE with the Jerusalem Talmud and 300 CE with the Babylonian Talmud and extending through the Middle Ages, rabbis started to debate and define kosher laws. As the laws increased in number and complexity, following ritual slaughter laws became difficult for Jews who were not trained in those laws. This resulted in the need for a shochet (someone who has studied shechita extensively) to perform the slaughtering in the communities. Shochtim studied under rabbis to learn the laws of shechita. Rabbis acted as the academics who, among themselves, debated how to apply laws from the Torah to the preparation of animals. Rabbis also conducted experiments to determine under which terefot animals were no longer kosher. Shochtim studied under these rabbis, as rabbis were the officials who first interpret, debate, and determine the laws of shechita.

Shochtim are essential to every Jewish community, so they earn elevated social status. In the Middle Ages, the shochtim were treated as second in social status, just underneath rabbis. Shochtim were respected for committing their time to studying and for their importance to their communities.

An inspection (Heb. bedikah) of the animal is required for it to be declared kosher, and a shochet has a double title: Shochet u'bodek (slaughterer and inspector), for which qualification considerable study as well as practical training is required.

Procedure

The shechita procedure, which must be performed by a shochet, is described in the Yoreh De'ah section of the Shulchan Aruch only as severing the wind pipe and food pipe (trachea and esophagus). Nothing is mentioned about veins or arteries.

However, in practice, as a very long sharp knife is used, in cattle the soft tissues in the neck are sliced through without the knife touching the spinal cord, in the course of which four major blood vessels, two of which transport oxygenated blood to the brain (the carotid arteries) the other two transporting blood back to the heart (jugular veins) are severed. The vagus nerve is also cut in this operation. With fowl, the same procedure is followed, but a smaller knife is used.

A special knife is used, that is very long; and no undue pressure may be applied to the knife, which must be very sharp. The procedure may be performed with the animal either lying on its back (shechita munachat) or standing (shechita me'umedet).

In the case of fowl (with the exception of large fowl like turkey) the bird is held in the non-dominant hand in such a way that the head is pulled back and the neck exposed, while the cut made with the dominant hand.

The procedure is done with the intention of causing a rapid drop in blood pressure in the brain and loss of consciousness, to render the animal insensitive to pain and to exsanguinate in a prompt and precise action.

It has been suggested that eliminating blood flow through the carotid arteries does not cut blood flow to the brain of a bovine because the brain is also supplied with blood by vertebral arteries, but other authorities note the distinction between severing the carotid versus merely blocking it.

If one did not sever the entirety of both the trachea and esophagus then an animal may still be considered kosher as long as one severed the majority of the trachea and esophagus (windpipe and food pipe) of a mammal, or the majority of either one of these in the case of birds. The cut must be incised with a back-and-forth motion without employing any of the five major prohibited techniques, or various other detailed rules.

Forbidden techniques
 Shehiyah (delay or pausing)Pausing during the incision and then starting to cut again makes the animal's flesh unkosher. The knife must be moved across the neck in an uninterrupted motion until the trachea and esophagus are sufficiently severed to avoid this. There is some disagreement among legal sources as to the exact length of time needed to constitute shehiyah, but today the normative practice is to disqualify a kosher cut as a result of any length of pausing. 
 Derasah (pressing/chopping)The knife must be drawn across the throat by a back and forth movement, not by chopping, hacking, or pressing without moving the knife back and forth. There are those who assert that it is forbidden to have the animal in an upright position during shechita due to the prohibition of derasah. They maintain that the animal must be on its back or lying on its side, and some also allow for the animal to be suspended upside down. However, the Rambam explicitly permits upright slaughter, and the Orthodox Union as well as all other major kosher certifiers in the United States accept upright slaughter.  
 Haladah (covering, digging, or burying)The knife must be drawn over the throat so that the back of the knife is at all times visible while shechita is being performed. It must not be stabbed into the neck or buried by fur, hide, feathers, the wound itself, or a foreign object (such as a scarf) which may cover the knife. 
 Hagramah (cutting in the wrong location)Hagramah refers to the location on the neck on which a kosher cut may be performed; cutting outside this location will in most cases disqualify a kosher cut. According to today's normative Orthodox practice, any cutting outside this area will in all cases disqualify a kosher cut. The limits within which the knife may be applied are from the large ring in the windpipe to the top of the upper lobe of the lung when it is inflated, and corresponding to the length of the pharynx. Slaughtering above or below these limits renders the meat non-kosher.
 Iqqur (tearing)If either the esophagus or the trachea is torn during the shechita incision, the carcass is rendered non-kosher. Iqqur can occur if one tears out the esophagus or trachea while handling an animal's neck or if the esophagus or trachea is torn by a knife with imperfection/s on the blade, such as nicks or serration. In order to avoid tearing, the kosher slaughter knife is expertly maintained and regularly checked with the shochet's fingernail to ensure that no nicks are present.

Breaching any of these five rules renders the animal nevelah; the animal is regarded in Jewish law as if it were carrion.

Temple Grandin has observed that "if the rules (of the five forbidden techniques) are disobeyed, the animal will struggle. If these rules are obeyed, the animal has little reaction."

The knife

The knife used for shechita is called a sakin, or alternatively a chalaf by Ashkenazi Jews. By biblical law the knife may be made from anything not attached directly or indirectly to the ground and capable of being sharpened and polished to the necessary level of sharpness and smoothness required for shechita. The tradition nowadays is to use a very sharp metal knife.

The knife must be at least slightly longer than the neck width but preferably at least twice as long as the animal's neck is wide, but not so long that the weight of the knife is deemed excessive. If the knife is too large, it is assumed to cause derasah, excessive pressing. Kosher knife makers sell knives of differing sizes depending on the animal. Shorter blades may technically be used depending on the number of strokes employed to slaughter the animal, but the normative practice today is that shorter blades are not used. The knife must not have a point. It is feared a point may slip into the wound during slaughter and cause haladah, covering, of the blade. The blade may also not be serrated, as serrations cause iqqur, tearing.

The blade cannot have imperfections in it. All blades are assumed by Jewish law to be imperfect, so the knife must be checked before each session. In the past the knife was checked through a variety of means. Today the common practice is for the shochet to run their fingernail up and down both sides of the blade and on the cutting edge to determine if they can feel any imperfections. They then use a number of increasingly fine abrasive stones to sharpen and polish the blade until it is perfectly sharp and smooth.

After the slaughter, the shochet must check the knife again in the same way to be certain the first inspection was properly done, and to ensure the blade was not damaged during shechita. If the blade is found to be damaged, the meat may not be eaten by Jews. If the blade falls or is lost before the second check is done, the first inspection is relied on and the meat is permitted.

In previous centuries, the chalaf  was made of forged steel, which was not reflective and was difficult to make both smooth and sharp. Shneur Zalman of Liadi, fearing that Sabbateans were scratching the knives in a way not detectable by normal people, introduced the Hasidic hallaf. It differs from the previously used knife design because it is made of molten steel and polished to a mirror gloss in which scratches could be seen as well as felt. The new knife was controversial and one of the reasons for the 1772 excommunication of the Hasidim. As of present time, the "Hassidic hallef" is universally accepted and is the only permitted blade allowed in religious communities.

Other rules
The animal may not be stunned prior to the procedure, as is common practice in non-kosher modern animal slaughter since the early 20th century.

It is forbidden to slaughter an animal and its young on the same day. An animal's "young" is defined as either its own offspring, or another animal that follows it around.

The animal's blood may not be collected in a bowl, a pit, or a body of water, as these resemble ancient forms of idol worship.

If the shochet accidentally slaughters with a knife dedicated to idol worship, he must remove an amount of meat equivalent to the value of the knife and destroy it. If he slaughtered with such a knife on purpose, the animal is forbidden as not kosher.

Post-procedure requirements

Bedikah
The carcass must be checked to see if the animal had any of a specific list of internal injuries that would have rendered the animal a treifah before the slaughter. These injuries were established by the Talmudic rabbis as being likely to cause the animal to die within 12 months time.

Today all mammals are inspected for lung adhesions ( "examination of the lung") and other disqualifying signs of the lungs, and most kosher birds will have their intestines inspected for infections.

Further inspection of other parts of the body may be performed depending on the stringency applied and also depending on whether any signs of sickness were detected before slaughter or during the processing of the animal.

Glatt
Glatt and halak both mean "smooth". In the context of kosher meat, they refer to the "smoothness" (lack of blemish) in the internal organs of the animal. In the case of an adhesion on cattle's lungs specifically, there is debate between Ashkenazic customs and Sephardic customs. While there are certain areas of the lung where an adhesion is allowed, the debate revolves around adhesions which do not occur in these areas.

Ashkenazic Jews rule that if the adhesion can be removed (there are various methods of removing the adhesion, and not all of them are acceptable even according to the Ashkenazic custom) and the lungs are still airtight (a process that is tested by filling the lungs with air and then submerging them in water and looking for escaping air), then the animal is still kosher but not glatt.

If, in addition, there were two or fewer adhesions, and they were small and easily removable, then these adhesions are considered a lesser type of adhesion, and the animal is considered glatt. Ashkenazi custom permits eating non-glatt kosher meat, but it is often considered praiseworthy to only eat glatt kosher meat.

Sephardic Jews rule that if there is any sort of adhesion on the forbidden areas of the lungs, then the animal is not kosher. This standard is commonly known as halak Beit Yosef. It is the strictest in terms of which adhesions are allowed.

However, despite this ruling, in practice most Sephardic and Mizrahi communities historically ate non-halak meat, except those in Syria, Egypt, Iraq, and the Land of Israel.

The Rema (an Ashkenazi authority) had an additional stringency, of checking adhesions on additional parts of the lung which Sephardi practice does not require. Some Ashkenazi Jews keep this stringency.

Nikkur 

Porging refers to the halakhic requirement to remove the carcass's veins, chelev (caul fat and suet) and sinews. The Torah prohibits the eating of certain fats, so they must be removed from the animal. These fats are typically known as chelev. There is also a biblical prohibition against eating the sciatic nerve (gid hanasheh), so that, too, is removed.

The removal of the chelev and the gid hanasheh, called nikkur, is considered complicated and tedious, and hence labor-intensive, and even more specialized training is necessary to perform the act properly.

While the small amounts of chelev in the front half of the animal are relatively easy to remove, the back half of the animal is far more complicated, and it is where the sciatic nerve is located.

In countries such as the United States, where there exists a large non-kosher meat market, the hindquarters of the animal (where many of these forbidden meats are located) is often sold to non-Jews, rather than trouble with the process.

This tradition goes back for centuries where local Muslims accept meat slaughtered by Jews as consumable; however, the custom was not universal throughout the Muslim world, and some Muslims (particularly on the Indian subcontinent) did not accept these hindquarters as halal. In Israel, on the other hand, specially trained men are hired to prepare the hindquarters for sale as kosher.

Kashering
Because of the biblical prohibition of eating blood, all blood must be promptly removed from the carcass.

All large arteries and veins are removed, as well as any bruised meat or coagulated blood. Then the meat is kashered, a process of soaking and salting the meat to draw out all the blood. A special large-grained salt, called kosher salt, is used for the kashering process.

If this procedure is not performed promptly, the blood is considered to have "set" in the meat, and the meat is no longer salvageable to eat except when prepared through broiling with appropriate drainage.

Giving of the Gifts

The Torah requires a shochet to give the foreleg, cheeks and maw to a kohen even though he does not own the meat. Thus, it is desirable that the shochet refuse to perform the shechita unless the animal's owner expresses their agreement to give the gifts. Rabbinical courts have the authority to excommunicate a shochet who refuses to perform this commandment.

The Rishonim pointed out that the shochet cannot claim that, since the animal does not belong to him, he cannot give the gifts without the owner's consent. On the contrary, since the average shochet is reputed to be well versed and knowledgeable in the laws of shechitah ("Dinnei Shechita"), the rabbinical court relies on him to withhold his shechita so long as the owner refuses to give the gifts.  In 2018, Grandin stated that kosher slaughter, no matter how well it is done, is not instantaneous, whereas stunning properly with a captive bolt is instantaneous.

Efforts to improve conditions in shechita slaughterhouses
Temple Grandin is opposed to shackling and hoisting as a method of handling animals and wrote, on visiting a shechita slaughterhouse,

Efforts are made to improve the techniques used in slaughterhouses. Temple Grandin has worked closely with Jewish slaughterers to design handling systems for cattle, and has said: "When the cut is done correctly, the animal appears not to feel it.  From an animal-welfare standpoint, the major concern during ritual slaughter are the stressful and cruel methods of restraint (holding) that are used in some plants."

When shackling and hoisting is used, it is recommended that cattle not be hoisted clear of the floor until they have had time to bleed out.

Agriprocessors controversy
The prohibition of stunning and the treatment of the slaughtered animal expressed in shechita law limit the extent to which Jewish slaughterhouses can industrialize their procedures.

The most industrialized attempt at a kosher slaughterhouse, Agriprocessors of Postville, Iowa, became the center of controversy in 2004, after People for the Ethical Treatment of Animals released a gruesome undercover video of cattle struggling to their feet with their tracheas and esophagi ripped out after shechita. Some of the cattle actually got up and stood for a minute or so after being dumped from the rotating pen.

The OU's condonation of Agriprocessors as a possibly inhumane, yet appropriately glatt kosher company has led to discussion as to whether or not industrialized agriculture has undermined the place of halakha (Jewish law) in shechita as well as whether or not halakha has any place at all in Jewish ritual slaughter.

Jonathan Safran Foer, a Jewish vegetarian, narrated the short documentary film If This Is Kosher..., which records what he considers abuses within the kosher meat industry.

Forums surrounding the ethical treatment of workers and animals in kosher slaughterhouses have inspired a revival of the small-scale, kosher-certified farms and slaughterhouses, which are gradually appearing throughout the United States.

See also

 Christian dietary laws
 Comparison of Islamic and Jewish dietary laws
 DIALRELreport from the EU
 DhabihahIslamic ritual slaughter
 JhatkaIndian ritual slaughter
 Mashgiach
 Joseph Molcho
 Schochetsurname meaning "slaughterer"
 Tza'ar ba'alei chayimJewish commandment which bans causing animals unnecessary suffering
, a severe halakhic controversy about a specific type of terefah, among the Fez Jewry between Toshavim and Megorashim

Notes

References

Further reading
 
 The Jewish method of Slaughter Compared with Other Methods : from the Humanitarian, Hygienic, and Economic Points of View (1894) Author: Dembo, Isaak Aleksandrovich, 1847?–1906 [the date is incorrectly given as 1984, corrected here]
 Neville G. Gregory, T. Grandin: Animal Welfare and Meat Science Publisher: CABI; 1 edition 304 pp (1998)
 Pablo Lerner and Alfredo Mordechai Rabello The Prohibition of Ritual Slaughtering (Kosher Slaughtering and Halal) and Freedom of Religion of Minorities Journal of Law and Religion 2006
 Dorothee Brantz Stunning Bodies: Animal Slaughter, Judaism, and the Meaning of Humanity in Imperial Germany
 Robin Judd  The Politics of Beef: Animal Advocacy and the Kosher Butchering Debates in Germany
 Appendix I in Meat and Meat Processing. Y. H. Hui; (CRC Press. Second Edition 2012) A Discussion of Stunned and Nonstunned Slaughter prepared by an International Group of Scientists and Religious Leaders: Dr Shuja Shali (Muslim Council of Britain), Dr Stuart Rosen (Imperial College, London, UK), Dr Joe M. Regenstein (Cornell University, USA) and Dr Eric Clay (Shared Journeys, USA). Reviewers: Dr Temple Grandin (Colorado State University, USA), Dr. Ari Zivotofsky (Bar-Ilan University, Israel) Dr Doni Zivotofsky (DVM, Israel), Rabbi David Sears (Author of Vision of Eden, Brooklyn, USA, Dr Muhammad Chaudry (Islamic Food and Nutrition Council of America, Chicago) and Paul Hbhav, (Islamic Services of America) Google books
 David Fraser Anti-Shechita Prosecutions in the Anglo-American World, 1855–1913: "A major attack on Jewish freedoms"(North American Jewish Studies)

External links
 Ari Z. Zivotofsky Government Regulations of  Shechita (Jewish Religious Slaughter) in the Twenty-first Century: Are They Ethical? 
 Resolution on Disturbing Trends in Europe of Concern to Jewish and Other Religious Minorities The Rabbinical Assembly 
The assault on shechita and the future of Jews in Europe. World Jewish Congress
Lewis, Melissa A Comparative Analysis of Kosher Slaughter Regulation, and recommendations as to how this issue should be dealt with in the United States
The Cutting Edge: The debate over  the regulation of ritual slaughter in the western world Jeremy A. Rovinsky
Shechita at The Orthodox Union
What's the Truth about Niqqur Acharonayim? by Rabbi Dr. Ari Z. Zivotofsky
Laws of Judaism concerning food laws of ritual slaughter
Shechita – The Jewish Religious Humane Method of Animal Slaughter for Food
Shehitah: A photo essay
From the Slaughterhouse to the Consumer. Transparency and Information in the Distribution of Halal and Kosher Meat. Dialrel project report.  Authors: J. Lever, María Puig de la Bellacasa, M. Miele, Marc Higgin. University of Cardiff Cardiff, UK
dialrel final report: Consumer and Consumption issues: Halal and Kosher Focus Groups Results Dr Florence Bergeaud-Blacker IREMAM (CNRS) & Université de la Méditerrainée, Aix-Marseille; Dr Adrian Evans, University of Cardiff; Dr Ari Zivotofsky, Bar-Ilan University
Comparative Report of the Public Debates on Religious Slaughter in Germany, UK, France & Norway. DIALREL Encouraging Dialogue in Issues of Religious Slaughter. Comparative report: Lill M Vramo & Taina Bucher: SIFO (National Institute for Consumer Research); National Reports (in appendix): Florence Bergeaud-Blecker (French report) Adrian Evans (UK report) Taina Bucher, Lill M. Vramo & Ellen Esser (German report) Taina Bucher, Laura Terragni & Lill M. Vramo (Norwegian report) 01/03/2009
S.D. Rosen Physiological Insights into Shechita The Veterinary Record (2004) 154, 759–765
Should Animals be Stunned Before Slaughter? Raffi Berg BBC
 Rabbi Eliezer Melamed, What Does "Glatt" Mean? on Arutz Sheva.

Animal rights
Cruelty to animals
Kashrut
Kosher meat
Ritual slaughter
Hebrew words and phrases in Jewish law